Franz Schöbel (born 6 April 1956 in Weilheim, Bavaria) is a German cross-country skier who competed from 1980 to 1984. He finished sixth in the 4 × 10 km relay at the 1984 Winter Olympics in Sarajevo.

Schöbel's best World Cup career finish was 16th in a 15 km event in Switzerland in 1983.

Cross-country skiing results
All results are sourced from the International Ski Federation (FIS).

Olympic Games

World Championships

World Cup

Season standings

References

External links

1956 births
Living people
Cross-country skiers at the 1980 Winter Olympics
Cross-country skiers at the 1984 Winter Olympics
German male cross-country skiers
Olympic cross-country skiers of West Germany
People from Weilheim-Schongau
Sportspeople from Upper Bavaria